Chapter Two is a 1979 American Metrocolor romantic comedy-drama film directed by Robert Moore, produced by Ray Stark, and based on Neil Simon's 1977 Broadway play of the same name. It has a 124-minute running time. It stars James Caan and Marsha Mason, in an Academy Award-nominated performance.

Plot
George Schneider is an author living in New York City whose hours are occupied by his work, softball games in the park and visits from his married brother Leo, a press agent who has been trying to introduce widower George to eligible women. George's emotions are still raw from the death of his wife, and he continues to be reminded of her.

George is given the phone number of a Jennie MacLaine, an actress Leo recently met through his friend Faye Medwick, and dials it accidentally while intending to call someone else. After an awkward exchange, he repeatedly phones Jennie to explain why he called, even though she makes it clear that she, too, has no interest in a blind date. George's persistence results in her accepting his proposal of a "five-minute" date, face-to-face. If that doesn't go well, he promises to leave her alone.

They meet at her apartment and immediately hit it off. Jennie is recently divorced from a professional football player.  George explains how Leo has set him up on a number of disastrous dates, so he now finds himself pleasantly surprised to be with someone like her.  George asks her for a traditional date, she accepts and their whirlwind romance begins.

Leo is pleased and so is Faye, whose own marriage is on the rocks. To their astonishment, George and Jennie decide to get married after knowing each other only a brief time. Leo feels his brother is going much too fast. Faye asks to use Jennie's apartment while the couple is away on their honeymoon.

An idyllic trip to the Caribbean follows and George and Jennie are very happy, at least until another tourist who recognizes him extends condolences about George's deceased wife. He immediately sinks into a depression that continues through their return to New York. At his home, Jennie's attempts to cheer up George are met with curt responses and insults. She returns to her own apartment to discover that Faye is having an affair there with Leo.

The marriage appears to be over almost as quickly as it began. George comes to his senses just in time, realizing how much he loves Jennie and how he doesn't want to lose her.

Cast

 James Caan as George Schneider
 Marsha Mason as Jennie MacLaine
 Joseph Bologna as Leo Schneider
 Valerie Harper as Faye Medwick
 Alan Fudge as Lee Michaels
 Judy Farrell as Gwen Michaels
 Debra Mooney as Marilyn
 Isabel Cooley as Customs Officer
 Imogene Bliss as Elderly Lady in Bookstore
 Barry Michlin as Maitre d'
 Ray Young as Gary
 Greg Zadikov as Waiter
 Paul Singh as Waiter (as Dr. Paul Singh)
 Sumant as Waiter
 Cheryl Bianchi as Electric Girl

Production
An adaptation of a semi-autobiographical play by director-dramatist Neil Simon, the story conveys the coping and coupling of George, a recently widowed writer (played by James Caan), who is introduced by his press agent brother to Jennie, a just-divorced actress. Both are uncertain of whether to start dating so soon and George has recurring memories of his deceased wife. Jennie is portrayed by Simon's then-wife Marsha Mason, the inspiration for the character. Caan said he made the film to earn some money while preparing to direct the 1980 film Hide in Plain Sight.

The film was the fourth collaboration between Simon, producer Stark and Columbia Pictures after Murder By Death (1976), The Cheap Detective (1978) and California Suite (1978). The film started production July 23, 1979.

Reception

Box office performance
The film was a financial hit. It grossed $30 million at the domestic box office, making it the 27th highest-grossing film of 1979.

Critical reception
Chapter Two received mixed reviews from critics. Roger Ebert of the Chicago Sun-Times awarded the film 2 stars out of 4, writing "Chapter Two is called a comedy, maybe because that's what we expect from Neil Simon. It's not, although it has that comic subplot. It's a middlebrow, painfully earnest, overwritten exercise in pop sociology. I'm not exactly happy describing Neil Simon's semi-real-life in those terms, but then those are the terms in which he's chosen to present it. My notion is that Simon would have been wiser to imagine himself writing about another couple, and writing for another actress than his own wife; that way maybe he wouldn't have felt it so necessary to let both sides have the last word". Gene Siskel of the Chicago Tribune gave 2.5 stars out of four and wrote, "It's sweet, traditional, very safe, and riddled only with about 30 of Simon's punch-line jokes that may be OK on stage but are deadly mannered on film." Janet Maslin of The New York Times described the love affair as "a whirlwind courtship with a gentle, lazy pace, which is one of many reasons why the film version feels self-contradictory, or at least incomplete. Fortunately, Miss Mason gives a vibrant, appealing performance that minimizes the movie's troubles and encourages the audience to sit back and enjoy the scenery." Variety stated: "'Chapter Two' represents Neil Simon at his big-screen best. Ray Stark's film version of Simon's successful and loosely autobiographical play is tender, compassionate and gently humorous all at once." Charles Champlin of the Los Angeles Times called it "Simon's most successful transference so far of play into film", with a performance by Mason that was "simply remarkable." Writing in The New Yorker, Roger Angell observed that "James Caan, who is required to stare miserably out of a lot of different windows, seems ill at ease when delivering banter and/or moody musings. The only moments of real irony or interest are some tough, direct exchanges between Leo and Faye in the middle of their brief, miserable, inevitable affair." Filmink argued the movie "has brilliant source material and Mason is perfect but – as much as I hate to admit this – is sunk by Caan’s performance, which plays all of the grief of his widow character, and none of the humour."

On Rotten Tomatoes the film holds a 50% rating, based on reviews from 8 critics, with an average rating of 5.3/10.

James Caan later called the film a "nothing. Although I do like working with Marsha. I needed the work. I had been working on Hide in Plain Sight for two years. I didn't have any money."

Awards

In popular culture
A portion of the 1979 film was featured in the plot of "The Letter", a Season 3 episode of the American sitcom Seinfeld. In the episode, Jerry's artistic ex-girlfriend sends him a thoughtful letter trying to get him back. Later seeing a broadcast of Chapter Two on TV, Jerry realizes she copied the letter from the film word-for-word. In a deleted scene included with the DVD release of the episode, Jerry retaliates by breaking up with her using dialogue copied word-for-word from Plaza Suite, another Neil Simon film.

References

External links
 
 
 
 
 

1979 films
1979 romantic comedy films
1979 romantic drama films
1979 comedy-drama films
1970s romantic comedy-drama films
American films based on plays
American romantic comedy-drama films
Columbia Pictures films
Films about actors
Films about writers
Films based on works by Neil Simon
Films directed by Robert Moore
Films scored by Marvin Hamlisch
Films set in New York City
Films with screenplays by Neil Simon
1970s English-language films
1970s American films